Robert Priest (born 10 July 1951, in Walton-on-Thames, England) is a Canadian poet, children's author and singer-songwriter. He has written eighteen books of poetry, four children's novels, four children's albums, and six CDs of songs and poems. Under the alias "Dr Poetry", he has also written and performed two seasons of poetry on CBC Radio's spoken-word show "Wordbeat" and is well known for his aphorisms and the No. 1 Alannah Myles hit "Song Instead of a Kiss". Of his adult poetry, The Pacific Rim Review has written "He is certainly one of the most imaginatively inventive poets in the country," while critic Bernice Lever has opined "Robert Priest’s poems will speak to many generations." Robert's children's poetry is also much praised. "His poetry for children is almost miraculous" gushed pre-eminent children's literature critic Michele Landsberg, "It is almost pure celebration." The Toronto Star described his selected poems as "passionate, cocky, alternately adoring and insulting." Priest's plays, novels and songs have earned him awards and recognition in Canadian literary circles and a growing worldwide readership. His 2022 CD of songs Love is Hard produced by Bob Wiseman is currently streaming worldwide and available for download on 'CDbaby'.

Biography
Born in 1951, his family emigrated to Toronto, Canada, at the age of four. His father spent seven years in the British Navy, and his mother, a part-time standup comedian was a member of the Women's Royal Naval Service (WRNS), popularly known as the Wrens. Growing up in Scarborough, Priest developed a love of literature from the fanciful stories his mother often told before bedtime and later from the books available to him from the bookmobile – a mobile public library. By the age of eight, Priest says, he had already begun to dream of becoming a writer. In 1970 he entered the University of Waterloo to study mathematics, but, much more compelled to write poetry dropped out after one semester. Since his first book of poetry (The Visible Man, 1979), he has published eighteen more books of poetry, four plays, four children's/young adult novels and many articles in Toronto's Now Magazine. He is also a singer-songwriter of note, having released six rock albums for adults and three collections of children's music.  He also wrote and performed numerous children's songs for CBC radio's Is Anybody Home and for the long-running television show Sesame Street. A song he cowrote with Nancy Simmonds and Alannah Myles was a number one hit in Canada and is still played all around the world. He lives in Toronto with Marsha Kirzner.

Awards and recognition
The author of 23 books of poetry and prose, he won the Milton Acorn Memorial People's Poetry Award for The Mad Hand (1988). Under his "Dr. Poetry" alias, he wrote and performed thirteen segments for CBC radio's spoken-word show Wordbeat. As a songwriter, he co-wrote (with Alannah Myles and Nancy Simmonds) the hit, "Song Instead of a Kiss" which rose to the top of the charts for two weeks in Canada and maintained that position for six weeks in Quebec receiving a SOCAN airplay award. It still receives considerable airplay all around the world. His aphorisms have already appeared in the Farmers' Almanac and Colombo's Canadian Quotations. He is the author of four plays, including The Coming, which was co-written with Leon Rooke. Priest's musical play Minibugs and Microchips received a Chalmers Award. His novel, Knights of the Endless Day (1993) received an Our Choice Award from the Canadian Children's Book Centre. Among his volumes of children's poetry, Daysongs Nightsongs and The Secret Invasion of Bananas and Other Poems (2002) are on a recommended reading list compiled by the CBC.His book of poems Reading the Bible Backwards (2008 ECW Press) reached number 2 on the Canadian poetry charts its sales exceeded only by Leonard Cohen. His 2013 book of poems for children and young adults Rosa Rose (Wolsak & Wynn) won a Silver Moonbeam Award and was a book of honour in the Lion and the Unicorn award for poetry in the North American category at Johns Hopkins University while its sequelThe Wolf is Back won the Gold Moonbeam Award for best book of children's poems in the Americas. His fantasy trilogy Spell Crossed was the winner of an Our Choice Award and has been described as a modern classic. A new collection of songs: 'Love is Hard' produced by Bob Wiseman was released this year and is available world-wide on the streaming services and through CDbaby. Robert also co-wrote the lead-off single 'Love Enough' for Julian Taylor's breakout album 'The Ridge. A new book of adult poetry If I Didn't Love the River will be published in the Fall of 2022 by ECW Press.

Selected bibliography
Adult poetry
The Visible Man (1980) Unfinished Monument
Sadness of Spacemen (1980) Dreadnaught
The Man Who Broke Out of the Letter X (1984) Coach House
The Three Roberts on Childhood (1984; Robert Sward and Robert Zend) 
The Mad Hand (1988) Coach House
Scream Blue Living (1992) 
Resurrection in the Cartoon (1997)  ECW Press
Time Release Poems (1997) Ekstasis
Blue Pyramids:New and Selected Poems (2002)  ECW Press
How to Swallow a Pig (2004)  ECW Press
Reading the Bible Backwards (Poems: ECW press) (2008) 
Previously Feared Darkness (Poems: ECW press) (2013) 

Children's Poetry and fiction
The Short Hockey Career of Amazing Jany (1986) Aya Press
The Ruby Hat (1987)  Aya Press
Knights of the Endless Day (1993)(Penguin Viking)
A Terrible Case of the Stars (Penguin)(1994)
The Secret Invasion of Bananas and Other Poems (2002)(Seraphim) 
Rosa Rose, with illustrator Joan Krygsman. (Wolsak and Wynn, 2013). 
The Wolf is Back, with illustrator Joan Krygsman. (Wolsak and Wynn, 2017). 
The Paper Sword (Dundurn, 2014), a young-adult fantasy novel. 
Second Kiss, (Dundurn, 2015) 
Missing Piece, (Dundurn, 2016) 

Recordings
The Robert Priest E.P. (Airwave Records) 1982
Congo Toronto/Rock Awhile (single) Robot Records 1986
Broken Star/Still Can't Say Goodbye (single) Major Label Records 1987
Rottweiler Pacifist (songs and poems) Coach House Press/the music Gallery 1990
Tongue‘n’Groove (‘Spoken Word and song CD’) Artisan Music 1997
Feeling the Pinch (CDbaby and streaming services) 2012
BAAM! (CDbaby and streaming services)2017
Love is Hard and streaming services (CDbaby)2022

Children's Music
Summerlong The Boinks (G-tel) 1984
Playsongs and Lullabies (children's music) (The Teds) Waterlily Music 1989
Winterlong (songs & poems for children) (The Teds, Waterlily Music) 1992
Daysongs Nightsongs ( children's songs and poems) Groundwood 1993

External links
 
 University of Toronto Library page on Robert Priest

References 

1951 births
Living people
Canadian male poets
Canadian children's writers
Writers from Scarborough, Toronto
20th-century Canadian male writers
20th-century Canadian poets